Hold My Hand is a 1938 British musical comedy film directed by Thornton Freeland and starring Stanley Lupino, Fred Emney and Barbara Blair. The film's plot follows a wealthy man who buys a newspaper, resulting in a series of romantic entanglements. It was based on a musical play by Lupino.

Cast

Critical reception
TV Guide rated the film two out of five stars, calling it an "Occasionally amusing farce."

References

External links

1938 films
British musical comedy films
1938 musical comedy films
Films shot at Associated British Studios
Films directed by Thornton Freeland
British black-and-white films
1930s English-language films
1930s British films